Abyss is a 2019 South Korean television series starring Ahn Hyo-seop, Park Bo-young and Lee Sung-jae. It aired on tvN in South Korea on Mondays and Tuesdays at 21:30 (KST).

Synopsis
Go Se-yeon is a beautiful prosecution lawyer at the top of her game, and Cha Min is her friend, an unattractive but rich heir to a cosmetics empire. They are both revived into different bodies by supernatural beings using an "Abyss" after their deaths in separate incidents. The "Abyss" is a celestial object which has the power to revive anything that has died; the reincarnated bodies take on the appearance of that person's soul. Go Se-yeon takes on a 'plainer' appearance, whilst Cha Min becomes very attractive and young; virtually the opposite of before. They start working together to find out the reason for their revival and who caused Go Se-yeon's death.

Cast

Main
 Ahn Hyo-seop as Cha Min
 Ahn Se-ha as Cha Min (before his death)
 Yang Han-yeol as young Cha Min
The rich yet unattractive successor to a cosmetics company who is reincarnated as an attractive young man after his death. He has been friends with Go Se-yeon since childhood.
Park Bo-young as Go Se-yeon (after reincarnation)/Lee Mi-do (before plastic surgery)
 Kim Sa-rang as Go Se-yeon (before her death)
 Lee Soo-min as young Go Se-yeon
A prosecution lawyer who is murdered by the Eomsan-dong serial killer. She tries to figure out who killed her and how she has been reincarnated.
 Lee Sung-jae as Oh Yeong-cheol / Oh Seong-cheol
A skilled surgeon who is referred to as a legend in the medical community. He has a mysterious demeanour and hidden secrets.

Supporting

Central District Prosecutors' Office / Dongbu Police Station
 Kwon Soo-hyun as Seo Ji-wook / Oh Tae-jin
 Kim Yeon-ung as young Seo Ji-wook
A prosecution lawyer and one of Go Se-yeon's colleagues before her death.
 Lee Si-eon as Park Dong-cheol
The police detective who is head of the investigation into Go Se-yeon's death. 
 Song Sang-eun as Lee Mi-do (after plastic surgery)
Go Se-yeon's former colleague and Dong-cheol's ex-girlfriend, who has left Korea for the United States.

Lan Cosmetics
 Han So-hee as Jang Hee-jin / Oh Su-jin
 Shim Hye-yeon as young Oh Su-jin (Ep. 5)
 Kang Ye-seo as teenage Oh Su-jin
Cha Min's fiancée who mysteriously disappears just before their wedding. 
 Yoon Yoo-sun as Eom Ae-ran
Cha Min's domineering mother and head of the family's cosmetics empire.
 Park Sung-yeon as Park Mi-soon
 Cha Min's nanny and housekeeper.
 Lee Ji-hyun as Jang Sun-young
 Jang Hee-jin's mother.

Others
  as Park Gi-man
The vengeful father of a victim of the Eomsan-dong serial killer.
  as Park Mi-jin
 Gi-man's daughter who is a victim of the Eomsan-dong serial killer.
 Lee Dae-yeon as Seo Cheon-shik
 Seo Ji-wook's father who is a chief judge.
  as Se-yeon's father
 Park Mi-hyun as Se-yeon's mother
 Kim Yoon-bo as Kim Sil-jang
 The secretary of the chairman of Lan Cosmetics.
 Kim Sung-bum as Detective Choi
 A detective in Team 1 and Park Dong-cheol's junior and right-hand man.

Special appearances
 Seo In-guk as male alien "grim reaper" (Ep. 1)
 Jung So-min as female alien "grim reaper" (Ep. 1)

Production
The first script reading took place in February 2019 in Sangam-dong, Seoul, South Korea.

Actors Seo In-guk and Jung So-min, who recently acted in The Smile Has Left Your Eyes (2018), made a special appearance.

Original soundtrack

Part 1

Part 2

Part 3

Viewership

Awards and nominations

Notes

References

External links
  
 
 
 

2019 South Korean television series debuts
2019 South Korean television series endings
South Korean crime television series
South Korean fantasy television series
South Korean romantic comedy television series
Television series by Studio Dragon
TVN (South Korean TV channel) television dramas
Korean-language Netflix exclusive international distribution programming